Noose for a Gunman is a 1960 American Western film directed by Edward L. Cahn and starring Jim Davis and Barton MacLane. It was later remade as The Quick Gun.

Plot
Though wanted for murder, gunslinger Case Britton returns home to Rock Valley when he learns that the stagecoach carrying his fiancée is being targeted by bandit Jack Cantrell in this suspenseful Western.

Cast
 Jim Davis as Case Britton
 Barton MacLane as Carl Avery
 Lyn Thomas as Della Haines
 Ted de Corsia as Cantrell
 Leo Gordon as Link Roy
 Harry Carey Jr. as Jim Ferguson
 Walter Sande as Tom Evans
 Bill Tannen as Willetts
 William Challee as Gorse

See also
 List of American films of 1960

References

External links
 
 
 

1960 films
American black-and-white films
American Western (genre) films
1960 Western (genre) films
Films directed by Edward L. Cahn
United Artists films
Films produced by Edward Small
1960s English-language films
1960s American films